Cântarea României (literally "Song [of praise] to Romania") was an annual national cultural festival in the Socialist Republic of Romania between 1976 and 1989 intended to promote ideologically-approved artistic manifestations, featuring both professional and amateur artists from across the country. Being part of Ceaușescu's policies to promote National Communism in Romania, the festival used folklore (especially folk music) and it had a role in shaping the national identity of the Romanians and the view of Romanian history. 

The festival gets its name from a 19th-century essay generally attributed to Alecu Russo.

References

Festivals in Romania
Romanian culture
Romanian nationalism
Socialist Republic of Romania